Liga Deportiva Universitaria (LDU) (University Sporting League in English), can refer to one of various Ecuadorian football teams originally made up by groups of university students from different cities.

Liga Deportiva Universitaria may refer to:
Liga Deportiva Universitaria de Cuenca, a professional football club based in Cuenca, Ecuador
Liga Deportiva Universitaria de Loja, a professional football club based in Loja, Ecuador
Liga Deportiva Universitaria de Portoviejo, a professional football club based in Port
Liga Deportiva Universitaria de Quito, a professional football club based in Quito, Ecuador